The Froissy Dompierre Light Railway (CFCD) is a  narrow gauge light railway running from Froissy (a hamlet of La Neuville-lès-Bray) to  Dompierre-Becquincourt, through Cappy, in the Somme department, France. It is run as a heritage railway by APPEVA (Association Picarde pour la Préservation et l'Entretien des Véhicules Anciens) and is also known as P'tit Train de la Haute Somme. It is the last survivor of the  narrow gauge trench railways of the World War I battlefields.

History

In 1915, the French Army built a railway along the Somme Canal between Péronne and Froissy. Between 1916 and 1918 the railway was at the Allied front line, and transporting 1,500 tonnes of materials daily. At Froissy, the metre gauge Réseau Albert connected with the CFCD.

After the war, the railway was used in assisting with the reconstruction and also to bring food into the villages it served. New lines were laid including a zig-zag to reach the Santerre Plateau. The line was by this time being used for the transportation of sugar beet to the sugar refinery in Dompierre. In 1927, a further deviation was built to avoid Cappy Port, which required a  tunnel. The line was extended to Chaulnes in 1931. The line escaped World War II with little damage, although one train of molasses was attacked by a British aircraft. Two Coferna diesel locomotives were acquired in 1942, working alongside the Feldbahn 0-8-0s. The steam locomotives were retired in 1946 and replaced by three Plymouth loco-tracteurs. The extensions to Péronne and Chaulnes had been removed by 1954 and increased competition from road traffic meant that the line ceased operations in 1972, by which time a preservation society had already started operations.

Preservation
APPEVA was formed in 1970 with the aim of preserving a  narrow gauge railway as a working museum. The CFCD was a good location, being between Paris and Lille near A1 motorway and close to Amiens. By 1974 the line was operating as far as the top of the zig-zag and in 1976 the full line to Dompierre was opened to traffic, following improvements to the level crossing on the Santerre Plateau. In 1996, a new museum was opened in Froissy.

The line starts from the Froissy terminus and follows the towpath along the Somme canal to the little station of Cappy. Once on the Santerre, the line runs on the side of the road to Dompierre. The terminus is located near the former sugar refinery of Dompierre.

APPEVA owns or has in store 9 steam locomotives, of which three are operating and some are considered as a Monument historique, and 24 diesel engines. The Froissy Dompierre Railway operates from April till the end of September, on Sundays and holidays, and every day of the week (except Monday) in July and August. The journey between the Froissy museum and the Dompierre terminus takes one hour. The CFCD is twinned with the Leighton Buzzard Light Railway.

APPEVA publishes a monthly magazine in French devoted to narrow gauge railways and touristic railways (Standard, metric and narrow gauge) called Voie Étroite.

Museum

The Musée des chemins de fer Militaires et Industriels (Military and Industrial Railways Museum), located near the line terminus in the hamlet of Froissy (French commune of La Neuville-lès-Bray), features a large collection of  gauge railway material, steam engines, diesel engines and wagons, in an  exhibition hall inaugurated in 1996.

It also features an interesting Fairbanks-Morse speeder of 1917, used by the US Army.

Rolling stock

Steam locomotives

Diesel locomotives

Passenger stock

The CFCD operates a variety of open and closed passenger stock, most of which is built on chassis of freight vehicles dating from World War I.

Freight stock

The CFCD has a variety of goods wagons, both open and closed, that date from World War I, and also examples of wagons from the industrial use of the line after World War I.

Visiting locomotives
During the 40th anniversary of preservation of the line in 2011, three British-based locomotives visited, including Darjeeling Himalayan Railway DHR 778.

See also
 Narrow gauge railway

References

External links 

 APPEVA, official web site
 Voie Étroite, official web site
 Description of a visit to the line

Froissy
Industrial railways
Somme (department)
600 mm gauge railways in France
Tourist attractions in Somme (department)
Railway lines in Hauts-de-France
Railways with Zig Zags